Covered smut of barley is caused by the fungus Ustilago hordei. The disease is found worldwide and it is more extensively distributed than either loose smut or false loose smut.

Symptoms 

Infected plants do not demonstrate symptoms until heading.  Kernels of infected plants are replaced by masses of dark brown smut spores. Smutted heads are hard and compact.  Infected plants may be stunted. Occasionally smut sori may also develop in leaf blades, where they appear as long streaks.

Disease cycle 

Infection is seed-borne within the seed, the fungus penetrating the endosperm while the grain is being formed. Infected seeds give rise to systemically infected plants.  The mycelium advances through the host tissue and becomes established behind the growing point.

The spores are not readily blown or washed away by wind or rain.  Spores are sticky in nature when present inside the membrane due to oily coating. At harvest, spore masses are broken up, scattering spores on grain.  Frequently, masses of spores remain intact and appear in harvested grain.  The fungus overwinters as teliospores on seed or in soil.

Pathotypes 

At least 13 pathotypes are known; virulence is governed by at least three single recessive and independent gene pairs.

Management 

Resistant cultivars and seed treatments are used to manage this disease.

Fungicides 

Seed treatments: carboxin, fenpiclonil, tebuconazole, triadimenol, triticonazole.

References

External links

Extension publications 
 EPPO
 Australia
 Canada: Alberta
 US: Oregon

Barley diseases
Fungal plant pathogens and diseases
Ustilaginomycotina